Soldatov (masculine; Russian: Солдатов) and Soldatova (feminine; Russian: Солдатова) is a Russian surname, derived from the word "солдат" (soldier).

People
 Alexey Soldatov (born 1951), Russian scientist
 Alexander Soldatov (1915–1999), Soviet diplomat
 Andrei Soldatov (born 1975), Russian investigative journalist
 Vladimir Soldatov (1875–1941), Russian and Soviet ichthyologist, zoologist
 Mikhail Soldatov (1926–1997), Soviet bodyguard
 Oleg Soldatov (born 1963), Russian conductor
 Aleksandra Soldatova (born 1998), Russian rhythmic gymnast

See also 
 Soldatova

Russian-language surnames